Pokémon: Indigo League (originally aired simply as Pokémon) is the first season of the Pokémon animated television series and the first season of Pokémon: The Original Series, known in Japan as Pocket Monsters (ポケットモンスター, Poketto Monsutā). It originally aired in Japan on TV Tokyo from April 1, 1997, to January 21, 1999. It later aired in the United States in first-run syndication from September 8 to November 20, 1998, and on Kids' WB/The WB from February 13 to November 27, 1999, concluding with the airing of the previously unreleased episode 18 on June 24, 2000. The first season premiered in South Korea on Seoul Broadcasting System from July 14, 1999, to June 14, 2000. It premiered in India on Cartoon Network on May 12, 2003.

This season, the narrator of the Pokémon anime (voiced in Japanese by Unshō Ishizuka, and in English by Rodger Parsons) will follow the beginning adventures of Ash Ketchum (voiced in Japanese by Rika Matsumoto, and in English by Veronica Taylor), a 10-year-old aspiring Pokémon trainer from Pallet Town who is given a Pikachu (voiced by Ikue Ōtani) by Pokémon researcher Professor Oak to begin his Pokémon journey. Ash is driven by his desire to win the Indigo Plateau's Pokémon League, a challenging tournament for outstanding Pokémon trainers who compete against each other in Pokémon battles. To qualify for the tournament, Ash must collect the required number of gym badges, which are tokens earned after defeating each of the Kanto region's elite Pokémon gym leaders. Early in the season, Ash befriends the water-type Pokémon trainer Misty, who befriends Ash in hopes of him replacing her destroyed bicycle, and Brock, a Pokémon breeder who is the leader of the Pewter City gym.

The episodes were directed by Masamitsu Hidaka and produced by Oriental Light and Magic and TV Tokyo.



Episode list

Music
The Japanese opening song is "Aim to Be a Pokémon Master" (めざせポケモンマスター, Mezase Pokémon Masutā) by Rika Matsumoto for all 82 episodes. The ending songs are "One Hundred Fifty-One" (ひゃくごじゅういち, Hyakugojūichi) by Unshō Ishizuka and Pokémon Kids for 27 episodes, "Meowth's Song" (ニャースのうた, Nyāsu no Uta by Inuko Inuyama for 16 episodes, "Fantasy in My Pocket" (ポケットにファンタジー, Poketto ni Fantajī) by Sachiko Kobayashi and Juri Ihata with musical performance by the Pokémon Philharmonic Orchestra for 16 episodes and the Christmas variant for 2 episodes, "Pokémon March" (ポケモン音頭, Pokémon Ondo) by Sachiko Kobayashi, Unshō Ishizuka and Kōichi Sakaguchi with an interlude by Shimai Niitsu, "Type: Wild" (タイプ：ワイルド, Taipu: Wairudo) by Rika Matsumoto for 12 episodes, and the English opening song is "Pokémon Theme" by Jason Paige, the anime size version serves as the ending theme for 52 episodes, and its shortened version serves as the ending theme for 26 episodes. The ending songs at the end of the episode are "Kanto Pokérap by James "D Train" Willams and Babi Floyd for 52 episodes, 32 Pokémon on Monday thru Wednesday, 30 Pokémon on Thursday, and 24 Pokémon on Friday, "My Best Friends" by Michael Whalen during episode 18 and for 6 episodes, "Double Trouble" by Rachael Lillis, Eric Stuart and Maddie Blaustien for 5 episodes, "What Kind of Pokémon Are You?" by Joshua Tyler for 4 episodes, "Together Forever" by J.P. Hartmann for 6 episodes, "2.B.A. Master" by Russell Velázquez for 7 episodes, and "Viridian City" by Jason Paige for 4 episodes.

Home media releases
The episodes of this season were originally released as a collection of 26 individual DVDs and VHS released by Viz Video and Pioneer Entertainment between December 13, 1998, and January 23, 2001.

Between 2006 and 2008, Viz Media re-released episodes of the season in three DVD compilations. The first twenty-six episodes of this season were released on DVD on November 21, 2006, with "Beauty and the Beach", being skipped. The second US season came out on November 13, 2007, with "Princess vs. Princess" and "The Purr-fect Hero" being moved onto the third part, to match the airing order. The third and final part was released on February 12, 2008.

On November 5, 2013, Viz Media and Warner Home Video re-issued the first 26 episodes on DVD with new packaging.

Viz Media and Warner Home Video released Pokémon: Indigo League - The Complete Collection on DVD in the United States on October 28, 2014. This release contains all three volumes of the series, consisting of 78 episodes in all, although this set lacks the episode "Holiday Hi-Jynx", which was banned by The Pokémon Company International in 2014 due to the controversial presence of Jynx.

Notes

References

External links
 
  at TV Tokyo 
  at Pokémon JP official website 

1997 Japanese television seasons
1998 Japanese television seasons
1999 Japanese television seasons
Season01